Beautiful Inside is a song by English singer Louise, released on 30 October 2000. The single was taken from her third solo album, Elbow Beach (2000), and contains a sample from the Wu-Tang Clan. The song charted at number 13 on the UK Singles Chart.

Track listings
UK CD1
 "Beautiful Inside" (radio edit)
 "Clear Water"
 "Better Back Off"
 "Beautiful Inside" (video)

UK CD2
 "Beautiful Inside" (radio edit)
 "Beautiful Inside" (D-Bops Saturday Night Mix)
 "Beautiful Inside" (Sleaze Sisters Anthem Mix)

UK cassette single
 "Beautiful Inside" (radio edit)
 "Clear Water"
 "Better Back Off"

Charts

References

Louise Redknapp songs
2000 singles
2000 songs
EMI Records singles
First Avenue Records singles
Songs written by Ghostface Killah
Songs written by Louise Redknapp
Songs written by Method Man
Songs written by Ol' Dirty Bastard
Songs written by Raekwon
Songs written by RZA